Luther Lane Stuart (May 23, 1892 – June 15, 1947) was an American professional baseball player who appeared in three games as a second baseman in  for the St. Louis Browns of Major League Baseball (MLB). Stuart became the first of three Major League players (the others being Walter Mueller and Johnnie LeMaster) to hit an inside-the-park home run in their first Major League Baseball at bat. It was Stuart's only hit in his three-game career. Stuart also became the first American League player to hit a home run in his first plate appearance. He worked as a scout for the New York Yankees after his playing career was over.

Death
Stuart committed suicide on June 15, 1947 by slicing his wrists and then shooting himself with a pistol at a realtor's office after being in ill health.

See also 
 List of players with a home run in first major league at bat

References

External links 

1892 births
1947 suicides
Major League Baseball infielders
Baseball players from North Carolina
St. Louis Browns players
Suicides by firearm in North Carolina
1947 deaths